William Ince may refer to:

William Ince (cabinet maker) (?–1804), English cabinet maker with John Mayhew, as Ince and Mayhew
William Ince (theologian) (1825–1910), British theologian
William Ince (MP), MP for Chester, 1660–1661
William Ince (priest), provost of St John's Cathedral, Oban